Saint Stanislaus Kostka Church may refer to:

Poland

 St. Stanislaus Kostka Church (Warsaw), or the Sanctuary of Blessed Jerzy Popiełuszko

United States

St. Stanislaus Kostka Church (Rochester, New York)
St. Stanislaus Kostka Church (Chicago)
St. Stanislaus Kostka Church (Pittsburgh), listed on the NRHP in Pennsylvania
St. Stanislaus Kostka Church (St. Louis, Missouri), listed on the NRHP in Missouri
St. Stanislaus Kostka Church (Wilmington, Delaware) in Wilmington, Delaware
St. Stanislaus Kostka Parish, Waterbury, designated for Polish immigrants in Waterbury, Connecticut
St. Stanislaus Kostka Parish, Woonsocket, designated for Polish immigrants in Woonsocket, Rhode Island
St. Stanislaus Kostka Mission, Rathdrum, Idaho, listed on the NRHP in Idaho